Széchenyi or Széchényi is the name of a wealthy Hungarian noble family which produced many politicians, landowners and influential figures within Austro-Hungarian Empire. It is not to be confused with other Szécsényi family that went extinct.

History
The family first appeared in the documents at the beginning of the 16th century and derived its name from the town of Szécsény. First prominent member and founder of family wealth was György Széchenyi (1603-1695), who served as Archbishop of Esztergom. The family received the title of Imperial Count in 1697 by Emperor Leopold I. In 1777 Count Ferenc Széchényi purchased the lands of Sárvár and Felvidék and from then on the family members bore the name Count Széchényi de Sárvár-Felsövidek. The elder, non-comital branch of the family bore the name Széchényi-Szabó but became extinct in the first half of the 20th century.

Notable members
 Ferenc Széchényi (1754–1820), founder of the Hungarian National Library and National Museum in Budapest
 Gladys Vanderbilt Széchenyi (1886–1965), American heiress from the prominent American Vanderbilt family, and the wife of a Hungarian count, László Széchenyi
 István Széchenyi (1791–1860), Hungarian politician, political theorist, and writer
 László Széchenyi (1879–1938), Austro Hungarian military officer, Imperial Chamberlain, diplomat and venture capitalist
 Beatrix Széchenyi de Sárvár-Felsővidék (1930–2021), Hungarian-German socialite and consort of the Schönburg family

Surnames of Hungarian origin
Hungarian noble families